Dalpalan (born Kang Ki-young on July 16, 1966) is a South Korean film score composer and music director. He frequently works in collaboration with musician Jang Young-gyu.

Filmography 

Bad Movie (1997)
The Cut Runs Deep (1998)
Lies (1999)
Resurrection of the Little Match Girl (2002)
Cowardly Vicious (2002; short film)
The Coast Guard (2002) - music dept.
A Bizarre Love Triangle (2002) - music dept.
R-Point (2004)
Three... Extremes (2004)
A Bittersweet Life (2005)
Boy Goes to Heaven (2005)
The Aggressives (2005)
The Fox Family (2006)
Goodbye Children (2006; short film)
Les Formidables (2006)
Tazza: The High Rollers (2006) - music dept.
Dasepo Naughty Girls (2006)
Love Exposure (2007)
Like Father, Like Son (2008)  - music dept.
The Good, the Bad, the Weird (2008)
Antique (2008)
Crush and Blush (2008) - music dept.
A Million (2009)
Foxy Festival (2010)
The Yellow Sea (2010) - music dept.
The Front Line (2011)
Quick (2011)
Moby Dick (2011)
Countdown (2011)
Dream the Good Dream (2011; short film)
The Thieves (2012)
Dangerously Excited (2012)
Man on the Edge (2013)
Cold Eyes (2013)
Secretly, Greatly (2013)
South Bound (2013)
For the Emperor (2014)
My Ordinary Love Story (2014)
The Silenced (2015)
Assassination (2015)
The Wailing (2016)
Vanishing Time: A Boy Who Returned (2016)
Fangs (2016)
The Sound of Memories (2016)
Yourself and Yours (2016)
Master (2016)
Claire's Camera (2017)
The Accidental Detective 2: In Action (2018)
Love+Sling (2018)
Believer (2018)
Hotel by the River (2018)
Samjin Company English Class (2020)
The Call (2020)
Collectors (2020)
Mine (TV series) (2021)
Secret Royal Inspector & Joy (2021)
 Gentleman (2022)

Awards and nominations

References

External links 
 

1966 births
Living people
South Korean film score composers
Male film score composers
Musicians from Seoul